Fort de Goede Hoop or Fort Good Hope was a fort on the Dutch Gold Coast, established in 1667 near Senya Beraku.

The Dutch had already had a lodge in Senya Beraku in the 1660s, but that was abandoned when the British built their fort at nearby Winneba. In 1704, the Dutch asked the Queen of Agona for permission to build a fort at Senya Beraku. It was to serve the gold trade with Akim, which is north of Agona. At first, the Dutch built a small triangular fort, that they called Fort de Goede Hoop (or Good Hope in English). The gold trade was not very prosperous, but later on slaves were sold at the fort. By 1715, the fort had become too small and the Dutch decided to double it in size by breaking away the diagonal and making it square-shaped. A slave prison was made in the southwest bastion of the fort. In the second half of the 18th century, the fort was surrounded by an outer wall. Because of its testimony to the Atlantic slave trade and European colonial exploitation, Fort Good Hope was inscribed on the UNESCO World Heritage List in 1979 along with several other castles in Ghana. 

Early in 1782, Captain Thomas Shirley in the 50-gun ship Leander and the sloop-of-war Alligator sailed to the Dutch Gold Coast. Britain was at war with The Netherlands and Shirley captured the small Dutch forts at Moree (Fort Nassau - 20 guns), Kormantin (Courmantyne or - 32 guns), Apam (Fort Lijdzaamheid or Fort Patience - 22 guns), Senya Beraku (Fort Goede Hoop - 18 guns), and Accra (Fort Crêvecoeur or Ussher Fort - 32 guns).

The fort was occupied between 1782 and 1785 by Britain, as well as by the local Akim population between 1811 and 1816. In 1868, the fort was ceded to the United Kingdom in a large trade of forts between the Netherlands and Britain.

This is the last fort that was built in the Gold Coast.

Physical Features 
Initially, the Dutch built a small triangular fort on the promontory that is located near a cove because of the proximity to a good landing beach. The triangular fort has three bastions located at the northeast, southwest and southeast corners.

In the year 1724, due to the limited size of the fort that could not cope with the increasing number of slaves, it was rebuilt into its present rectangular shape. It had four bastions with curtain walls, garrisons and halls for officers, kitchens, a female and male prison, stores, granary and powder magazine room. An outer wall was also built later on but the wall has almost disappeared.

The fort presently serves as a rest house and also a tourist attraction site.

Gallery

References

Buildings and structures completed in 1667
History of Ghana
Castles in Ghana
Dutch Gold Coast
1667 establishments in the Dutch Empire
Goede Hoop